Thomas Glenn Shypitka is a Canadian politician, who was elected to the Legislative Assembly of British Columbia in the 2017 provincial election. He represents the electoral district of Kootenay East as a member of the British Columbia Liberal Party caucus.

Shypitka is also an accomplished curler, having represented British Columbia at the 1991 Labatt Brier and 2010 Tim Hortons Brier.

Electoral record

References

British Columbia Liberal Party MLAs
Living people
British Columbia municipal councillors
Curlers from British Columbia
Canadian male curlers
Canadian sportsperson-politicians
Sportspeople from Cranbrook, British Columbia
Year of birth missing (living people)